The Battle of Poznań was a battle that took place on August 9, 1704 in Poznań, Poland during the Great Northern War.

The Swedes won the battle.

References

Poznan
1704 in Europe
Poznan
Poznan
Poznan
History of Poznań
1704 in the Polish–Lithuanian Commonwealth